The South Georgia Peanuts were a short-lived minor league baseball team, based in Albany, Georgia in 2007. The team's home games were held at Paul Eames Sports Complex.

History
The Peanuts played in the South Coast League and won the league title with a 59–28 record. However, the notoriety of the Peanuts was largely built upon the managerial comeback of Wally Backman, who had been hired as manager of the Arizona Diamondbacks and fired four days later due to reported legal troubles. His return to managing and the Peanuts' 2007 season were documented by the independent TV series Playing for Peanuts. 

On March 4, 2008, the Peanuts announced that pitching coach Buddy York had been promoted to manager after Wally Backman departed for the Joilet Jackhammers of the Northern League.  

On March 31, 2008, the South Coast League office issued an announcement that it was suspending operations as of April 1, citing an inability to close on a large amount of debt. The league reportedly lost over a million dollars in each of its markets during its first year. While the statement claimed that it planned to resume operations in 2009, the league never returned. As a result, the Peanuts dissolved along with the league.

2007 season

References

Defunct minor league baseball teams
South Coast League teams
Defunct independent baseball league teams
2007 establishments in Georgia (U.S. state)
2007 disestablishments in Georgia (U.S. state)
Sports clubs disestablished in 2007
Sports in Albany, Georgia
Defunct baseball teams in Georgia
Baseball teams established in 2007